The Fowler Swimming Pool and Bathhouse, located at 308 E. 6th in Fowler, Kansas, was built in 1936 by the Works Progress Administration, a New Deal work program.  It includes an oval pool and a bathhouse designed in Moderne style architecture.  It was listed on the National Register of Historic Places in 2009.  The listing included the pool and bathhouse as contributing elements and a restroom building as a non-contributing building.

It was deemed significant as an example of a New Deal-era program providing social and recreational resources.  It was one of 40 swimming pools facilities in Kansas that was built or improved by the Works Progress Administration.

References

Event venues on the National Register of Historic Places in Kansas
Sports venues on the National Register of Historic Places in Kansas
Streamline Moderne architecture in the United States
Buildings and structures completed in 1936
Meade County, Kansas
Works Progress Administration in Kansas
National Register of Historic Places in Meade County, Kansas